Codonosmilia is an extinct genus of stony corals.

See also 
 List of prehistoric hexacoral genera

References 

Rhipidogyridae
Scleractinia genera
Prehistoric Anthozoa genera
Bathonian life
Callovian life
Jurassic animals of Africa
Fossils of Tunisia
Jurassic animals of Asia
Fossils of Iran
Fossil taxa described in 1888